The 2012 NZIHL season was the eighth season of the New Zealand Ice Hockey League, the top level of ice hockey in New Zealand. Five teams participated in the league, and the Canterbury Red Devils won their second championship by defeating the Southern Stampede in the final.

Regular season

Final 
 Southern Stampede - Canterbury Red Devils 5:6 SO

External links 
 New Zealand Ice Hockey League official website

Seasons in New Zealand ice hockey
New Zealand Ice Hockey League seasons
Ice
New